Situm is a 1982 Hindi film directed by Aruna Raje and Vikas Desai starring Naseeruddin Shah, Smita Patil, Vikram and Asrani among others. The then husband-wife duo worked together in the name of Aruna-Vikas jointly, before Aruna went her separate way. The rights of this film are now owned by Glamour Eyes Films.

Plot
Inder, a star football player of a team thinks himself guilty of killing another football player Subhash who dies after the impact of football hit on his head which is kicked by Inder. He tries to ask for forgiveness from Meenakshi, Subhash's wife. He also gets affectionate with Subhash and Meenakshi's son. But, Meenakshi insults him and calls him killer and the person who has ruined her life. This has deep impact on Inder who is now bedridden, unstable and mentally ill, in Dr. Gindes Hospital. He starts showing signs of recovery when  Meenakshi starts meeting him after she realises that Inder's illness  is caused by her. In their regular meetings, Inder starts taking an interest in her, it becomes challenging for Meenakshi to reciprocate his affections. The dilemma before her is that if she spurns him he risks losing all signs of recovery.

Cast
 Naseeruddin Shah as Subhash
 Smita Patil as Meenakshi 
 Vikram as Inder 
 Asrani 
 Arun Sarnaik
 Keith Stevenson
 Vikas Desai
 Seema Deo
 Sulabha Deshpande as Meenakshi's mother

Music
All songs were composed by Jagjit Singh and Chitra Singh.

References

External links
 

1980s Hindi-language films
Films scored by Jagjit Singh
Films scored by Chitra Singh
Films directed by Aruna Raje
1982 films